Vannakkudi is a village in the Thiruvidaimarudur taluk of Thanjavur district, Tamil Nadu, in India.

Famous places
This village contains the Mariyamman temple and Samadhi of Vikrama Chozan just 1 km east of Mahalineswarar temple Thiruvidaimarudur - Lingathadi thidal - presently a private property. It was known Thiyagasamudra Chaturvedi mangalam during Vikrama period then renamed as Kulothunga chozha charutvedi Mangalam and eastern road to Vannakkudi was called Rajakkal Thambiran Thirveedhi.

Villages in Thanjavur district